is a national highway connecting the city of Yokosuka and the town of Ōiso in Kanagawa Prefecture, Japan.

References

134
Roads in Kanagawa Prefecture